The 2008 Kentucky Wildcats football team represented the University of Kentucky in the college football season of 2008–2009. The team's head coach was Rich Brooks, who served his sixth year in the position. The Wildcats played their home games at Commonwealth Stadium in Lexington, Kentucky.

Schedule

Depth chart

Game summaries

Louisville

Starters

 bold - Denotes returning starter
 ↑ - Denotes number of games started by the player at the listed position during the 2008 season.

 bold - Denotes returning starter
 ↑ - Denotes number of games started by the player at the listed position during the 2008 season.

WEEK 1 SEC DEFENSIVE PLAYER OF THE WEEK
MYRON PRYORDefensive TackleKENTUCKY6-1 • 310 • SeniorLouisville, Ky. (Eastern HS)

Norfolk State

Starters

 bold - Denotes started previous game
 ↑ - Denotes number of games started by the player at the listed position during the 2008 season.

 bold - Denotes started previous game
 ↑ - Denotes number of games started by the player at the listed position during the 2008 season.

Middle Tennessee

SEC OFFENSIVE PLAYER OF THE WEEKMIKE HARTLINEQuarterbackKENTUCKY6-6 • 204 • SophomoreCanton, Ohio (GlenOak HS)

Western Kentucky

SEC OFFENSIVE LINEMAN OF THE WEEKGARRY WILLIAMSTackleKENTUCKY6-3 • 300 • SeniorLouisville, Ky. (Seneca HS)

Alabama

{| class="wikitable"
|-
! Position
! Number
! Name
! Height
! Weight
! Class
! Hometown
! Games↑
|-
| QB
| 5
| Mike Hartline
| 6'6"
| 205''
| So.| Canton, Ohio| 5|-
| TB| 28| Tony Dixon| 5'9"| 203
| Sr.
| Parrish, Alabama
| 5
|-
| FB
| 38
| John Conner
| 5'11"
| 230
| Jr.
| West Chester, Ohio
| 5
|-
| WR
| 12
| Dicky Lyons
| 5'11"
| 190
| Sr.
| New Orleans, Louisiana
| 5
|-
| WR
| 17
| EJ Adams
| 6'0"
| 197
| Jr.
| Stone Mountain, Georgia
| 3
|-
| TE
| 80
| T.C. Drake
| 6'6"| 242| Jr.| Bardstown, Kentucky| 4|-
| LT| 79| Garry Williams| 6'3"| 300| Sr.| Louisville, Kentucky| 3|-
| LG| 72| Zipp Duncan| 6'5"| 295| Jr.| Magnolia, Kentucky| 5|-
| C
| 61| Jorge González| 6'3"| 303| Jr.| Tampa Bay, Florida| 5|-
| RG
| 73| Jess Beets| 6'2"| 293| Sr.| Dove Canyon, California| 5|-
| RT| 72
| Brad Durham
| 6'4"
| 310
| So.
| Mount Vernon, Kentucky
| 1
|}

South Carolina

Arkansas

Florida

Mississippi State

Georgia

Vanderbilt

Tennessee

East Carolina

Rankings

Statistics

Team

Scores by quarter

Offense

Rushing

Passing

Receiving

Defense

Special teams

Coaches
Head coach: Rich Brooks (6th year)

OffenseOffensive Coordinator/Wide Receivers: Joker PhillipsOffensive Scheme: SpreadQuarterbacks: Randy SandersOffensive Line: Jimmy HegginsRunning Backs: Larry BrownTight Ends: Steve Ortameyer

DefenseDefensive Coordinator: Steve BrownBase Defense: 4-3Defensive Line: Rick PetriLinebackers: Chuck SmithDefensive Backs:''' Chris Thurmond

Roster

Postseason awards

All-American

All-SEC

All-Freshman SEC

Preseason awards

All-SEC

Class of 2009 commitments/signees

References

Kentucky
Kentucky Wildcats football seasons
Liberty Bowl champion seasons
Kentucky Wildcats football